Dreadnaught may refer to:

 Dreadnaught (band), a heavy metal band in Melbourne, Australia
 Dreadnaught (film), a 1981 film by Yuen Woo-Ping
 Dreadnaught USA, an experimental rock band based in New Hampshire, US
 USLS Dreadnaught, a motor lifeboat that sank during a rescue in 1913
 USS Dreadnaught (YT-34), a tug in commission from 1918 to 1922 and in non-commissioned service from 1922 to 1944
 Dreadnaught wheel, a wheel with articulated rails attached at the rim to provide a firm footing
 Dreadnought (guitar type), a large acoustic guitar
 Beyond the Frontier: Dreadnaught, a novel by Jack Campbell
 "Dreadnaught", a song by Machinae Supremacy from Deus Ex Machinae
 Dreadnought (Star Trek: Voyager), an episode of Star Trek: Voyager

See also
 Edward Boscawen or "Old Dreadnaught" (1711–1761), Admiral in the Royal Navy
 HMS Dreadnought (1906), a revolutionary "all big gun" British battleship
 Dreadnought (disambiguation)